Miss Ukraine 2021 was the 30th Miss Ukraine pageant, held at the Palace "Ukraine" in Kyiv on 21 October 2021. Twenty-five contestants from across Ukraine competed for the crown. The competition was hosted by Volodymyr Dantes, Taras Tsimbalyuk, Timur Miroshnychenko and Vladyslav Yama. Oleksandra Yaremchuk of Vinnytsia Oblast was crowned at the end of the event. Yaremchuk represented Ukraine at the Miss World 2021 pageant where she unplaced.

Results

Placements

Special Awards

Contestants

Jury
Johan Ernst Nilson
Jacob Arabo
Simon de Pury
Tina Karol
Alec Monopoly
Cindy Bruna
Andre Tan 
Sonya Plakidyuk 
Irina Tatarenko 
Veronika Shchyptsova (Head of Miss Ukraine National Committee)

References

External links

2021
2021 beauty pageants
2021 in Ukraine
October 2021 events in Ukraine